Cojoc is a Romanian surname, meaning a type of coat. Notable people with the surname include:

 Constantin Cojoc (born 1981), Romanian judoka
 Samoel Cojoc (born 1989), Romanian footballer

See also
 Cojocaru

Romanian-language surnames